The Kandinsky Prize, named after Russian painter Wassily Kandinsky is an award sponsored by the Deutsche Bank AG and the Art Chronika Culture Foundation. It was organized in hopes of developing Russian contemporary art, and to reinforce the status of Russian art within the world. In total, 55,000 euros are awarded to the artists.

It was first given out on December 4, 2007, hosted at the Winzavod Contemporary Art Center in Moscow.  Four awards were given.  The Young Artist Category is awarded to an artist under 30 and they receive a three months stay in Villa Romana.  New Media Project of the year is awarded 10,000 euros.  Artist of the Year is awarded 40,000 euros.  Audience's Prize is awarded 5,000 euros.

The award has been evolving over the years. "One of the distinctive features of the prize is that artists are able to nominate themselves." Now the categories are 'Project of the Year', 'Young Artist. Project of the Year' and 'Scholarly Work. History and Theory of Contemporary Art'. Every year the venue changes, the finalists' projects being shown in different cities.

Background
On September 20, 2007, Deutsche Bank and ArtChronika presented their nominations of over 250 names for the Kandinsky Prize in a press conference.  Their work was displayed in exhibitions at Moscow’s Central House of Artist and in St. Petersburg.  It was eventually cut down to 50.  The winners were announced in December.  The objective is to promote contemporary Russian art and to offer insights into the art scene's most important trends and perspective.

"This is a natural progression. In the last two years, we have had the Biennale, art fairs and many exhibitions. With all these events, there comes growth in numbers of art critics, art investors, art foundations and institutes, and so we decided there should also be an art prize," Nikolai Molok, the editor of ArtKhronika.

Kandinsky Prize 2007

Jury
Jean-Hubert Martin, Valerie Higgins, and Andrey Yerofeyev.

Nomination

Project of the Year
Anatoly Osmolovsky, AES+F, Yuri Albert, Yuri Avvakumov, Katerina Belkina, Alexander Vinogradov and Vladimir Dubossarsky, Dmitri Vrubel and Victoria Timofeeva, Dmitry Gutov, Larisa Zvezdochetova, Alain Kirtsova, Vitaly Kopachev, Oleg Kulik, Konstantin Latyshev, Anton Litvin, Rauf Mamedov, Irina Nakhova, Nikola Ovchinnikov, George Pervov, Alexei Politov and Marina Belova, Alexander Sauko, Sergei Saigon, Sumnina Maria, Olga and Alexander Florensky, Gor Chahal, Yuri Shabelnikov.

Young Artist (aged up to 30)
Vladlena Gromova, Catherine Belyavskaya, Lyoha Garikovich, Peter Goloshapov, Bashir Borlakov, Ekaterina Gavrilova and Petr Zhukov, Oleg Dou, Diana Machulina, Alexei Stepanov, Sergei Uryvaev and Alexei Stepanov, Gregory Yushenko.

Media Art Project of the Year
Vladislav Mamyshev Monroe, Anton Litvin, Vladimir Logutov Alexei Buldakov and Petr Bystrov, Philip Dontcov, Oleg Kulik, Provmyza Victor Freudenberg, Marina Chernikov, Aristarchus Chernyshev.

Winners
 Young Artist (aged up to 30) — Vladlena Gromova
 Media Art Project of the Year — Vladislav Mamyshev-Monroe
 Artist of the Year — Anatoly Osmolovsky
 People's Choice Award — Peter Goloschapov

Kandinsky Prize 2008

Jury
Jean-Hubert Martin, Valerie Higgins, Andrei Erofeev, Friedhelm Hütte, Catherine Bobrinskaya, Alexander Borovsky

Nomination

Project of the Year
Alexey Belyaev-Gintovt, Dmitry Gutov, Boris Orlov, Victor Alimpiev, Peter White, Alexander Vertinsky, Sergei Vorontsov, Dmitri Vrubel and Victoria Timofeeva, group "Blue Noses", Olga Stone, Sergei Kostrikov, Gregory Maiofis Bogdan Mamonov, Boris Markovnikov, Diana Machulina, Rosedkin, Vincent Nilin and Dmitri Prigov, George Pervov, Igor Pestov, George Pusenkoff, Vitaly Pushnitsky, Kerim Ragimov, Leonid Rotar, Aidan Salakhova, Sergey Skachkov, Marina Fedorova, Galina Hailu, Dmitry Tsvetkov, Sergey Chilikov, Sergey Shekhovtsov.

Young Artist (aged up to 30)
Diana Machulina, Anna Gholud, Grigory Yushchenko, 3 ART, MAKE, Andrei Blokhin and Georgy Kuznetsov, Ilya Gaponov and Cyril Koteshov, Alexander Gronskiy, Alina Gutkina, Oleg Dou, Alexander Klymtsov, Lera Matveeva, Misha Most, Nikolai Rykunov, Anna Titova.

Media Art Project of the Year
Group "PG", Vladimir Logutov, Group "Blue Soup", Maria Andre, Hope Anfalova, Vladlen Gromov, Marina Zvyagintsev, Anton Litvin, Ksenia Peretrukhina, Group PROVMYZA, Programme ESCAPE, Thanatos Banionis, Alexander von Busch, Svetlana Hansemann, Marina Chernikov.

Winners
 Young Artist (aged up to 30) — Diana Machulina
 Media Art Project of the Year — PG Group (Ilya Falkovsky, Alexey Katalkin and Boris Spiridonov)
 Project of the Year — Alexey Belyaev-Gintovt

Kandinsky Prize 2009

Nomination

Project of the Year
Konstantin Batynkov, Peter White, Vita Buivid, Alexei Garikovich, Dmitry Gretzky, Alla Esipovich, Vadim Zakharov, Vladimir Kozin, Irina Korina, Rostislav Lebedev, Gregory Maiofis, Igor Moukhin, Nikolay Nasedkin, Arkady Nasonov, Pavel Pepperstein, Nikolay Polissky, Roman Sakin, Semen Fajbisovich, Natalia Khlebtsevich, Anastasia Horoshilova, Dmitry Tsvetkov, Cyril Chelushkin, Dmitry Shorin, Sergei Shutov.

Young Artist
Eugene Antufiev, Lyoha Garikovich, Ivan Lungin, Stepan Subbotin, Dmitry Teselkin, Alexander Frolov, ART 3, Makeev, Milk & Vodka, Recycle.

Media Art Project of the Year
Thanatos Banionis, Julia and Alexander Devlyashova Toschevikova, Alexandra Dementieva, Vadim Zakharov, Marina Zvyagintsev, Elena Kovylina Alexander Lavrov, Alexei Politov and Marina Belova PROVMYZA Olga Tobreluts and Dmitry Sokolenko, Aristarch Chernyshev and Alexei Shulgin.

Winners
 Young Artist (aged up to 30) — Evgeny Antufiev
 Media Art Project of the Year — Electroboutique (Aristarkh Chernyshev and Alexey Shulgin)
 Project of the Year — Vadim Zakharov

Kandinsky Prize 2010

Winners
 Young Artist — Taisia Korotkova for Reproduction (2009), Recycle (Andrei Blokhin and Georgy Kuznetsov) for Reverse
 Media Art Project of the Year — Andrei Blazhnov for Cost?
 Project of the Year — Alexander Brodsky for The Road

Kandinsky Prize 2011

Winners
 Young Artist — Polina Kanis for Eggs
 Media Art Project of the Year — Anastasia Ryabova for Artists' Private Collections
 Artist of the Year — Yuri Albert for Moscow Poll

Kandinsky Prize 2012

Winners
 Young Artist — Dmitry Venkov for Mad Mimes
 Main category — Grisha Bruskin for H-HOUR Sculpture project and AES+F Allegoria Sacra

Kandinsky Prize 2013

Winners
 Young Artist — Evgeny Granilshchikov for Positions and Tim Parchikov Times New Roman Episode III: Moscow
 Main category — Irina Nakhova for The project Untitled

Kandinsky Prize 2014

Winners
 Young Artist — Albert Soldatov for the project Baltus
 Main category — Pavel Pepperstein for the project Holy Politics
 Scholarly Work. History and Theory of Contemporary Art — Mihail Yampolskii for the work Gnosis in Images

Kandinsky Prize 2015

Winners
 Young Artist — Olya Kroytor for the project Fulcrum 
 Project of the Year —Filippov Andrey for the project The Wheel in the Head 
 Scholarly Work. History and Theory of Contemporary Art — Podoroga Valeriy for the project The Second Screen: S. Eisenstein and the Cinematography of Violence

Kandinsky Prize 2016

Winners
 Young Artist — Super Taus 
 Project of the Year — Andrey Kuzkin
 Scholarly Work. History and Theory of Contemporary Art — Victor Misiano

Kandinsky Prize 2017

Winners
 Young Artist — Sasha Pirogova 
 Project of the Year — ZIP Grouping
 Scholarly Work. History and Theory of Contemporary Art — Alexander Borovsky

Kandinsky Prize 2019

Winners
 Young Artist — Albina Mokryakova
 Project of the Year — Evgeny Antufiev
 Scholarly Work. History and Theory of Contemporary Art — Andrey Khlobystin

Kandinsky Prize 2021

Winners
 Young Artist — Albina Mokryakova
 Project of the Year — Andrey Kuzkin
 Scholarly Work. History and Theory of Contemporary Art — Roman Osminkin

See also
Turner Prize

References

 
Contemporary art awards
Awards established in 2007
Russian art awards
Wassily Kandinsky